Colonel Fred Kennedy is the former director of the Space Development Agency.

Education and career 
Kennedy received a Master of Science and Bachelor of Science, both in aeronautics and astronautics, from the Massachusetts Institute of Technology. He later earned a Master of Arts in organizational management from George Washington University, a Master of Arts in strategic studies from the U.S. Army War College, and a Doctor of Philosophy in electronics and physical sciences from the University of Surrey.

Kennedy served as the Office Director of the Tactical Technology Office at the Defense Advanced Research Projects Agency. Kennedy is a retired United States Air Force colonel.

References 

Year of birth missing (living people)
Living people
Alumni of the University of Surrey
MIT School of Engineering alumni
United States Air Force officers
United States Army War College alumni
George Washington University alumni